Mow Cop and Scholar Green railway station was a station on the North Staffordshire Railway between Stoke-on-Trent and Congleton. It served the village of Mow Cop.

The line was opened by the North Staffordshire Railway on 9 October 1848 but the station at Mow Cop did not open until the beginning of January 1849. It closed in 1964 and was immortalised that year in the song Slow Train by Flanders and Swann.

The signal box survived in use until 2002, and is now preserved privately in the village.

References

Railway stations in Great Britain opened in 1849
Railway stations in Great Britain closed in 1964
Disused railway stations in Cheshire
Former North Staffordshire Railway stations
Beeching closures in England